The Bahrain cricket team and Kuwait cricket team contested a five-match Twenty20 International (T20I) bilateral series in Oman in August 2022. The series provided Kuwait with preparation for the Asia Cup Qualifier that will be played at the same venue later in the month. The first match of the series ended as a tie, with Bahrain winning the Super Over tiebreaker. Kuwait levelled the series by winning a high-scoring second match. Kuwait won the third game, and went on to take an unassailable 3–1 lead in the series after winning the fourth game. The final game was a one-sided affair, with a hat-trick on his T20I debut for Shahrukh Quddus helping Kuwait take the match by 102 runs, and with it the series 4–1.

Squads

T20I series

1st T20I

2nd T20I

3rd T20I

4th T20I

5th T20I

Notes

References

External links
 Series home at ESPN Cricinfo

Associate international cricket competitions in 2022